Walter Kaufmann (June 5, 1871 – January 1, 1947) was a German physicist. He is best known for the first experimental proof of the velocity dependence of mass, which was an important contribution to the development of modern physics, including special relativity.

Life
Of Jewish descent, in 1890/1891, Kaufmann studied mechanical engineering at the technical universities of Berlin and Munich. From 1892, he studied physics at the Universities of Berlin and Munich, attaining a doctorate in 1894. From 1896, he was an assistant at the physical institutes of the Universities of Berlin and Göttingen. Kaufmann habilitated in 1899, and became a professor extraordinarius of physics at the University of Bonn. After further work at the Berliner Physikalisches Institut, he became professor ordinarius for experimental physics and leader of the physical institute at the Albertina in Königsberg, where he taught until he retired in 1935. Later, he was guest lecturer at the University of Freiburg.

Measurements of velocity dependence of mass

Kaufmann's early work (1901–1903) confirmed for the first time the velocity dependence of the electromagnetic mass (later called relativistic mass) of the electron. However, the measurements were not accurate enough to differentiate between the Lorentz ether theory and that of Max Abraham.

At the end of 1905, Kaufmann carried out more accurate measurements. He was the first to discuss Albert Einstein's theory of special relativity, and argued that, although Einstein's theory is based on quite different conditions and is logically more satisfying, it is observationally equivalent to Lorentz's theory. Therefore, he spoke of the "Lorentz-Einstein" theory. It is notable that Kaufmann himself interpreted his experimental results as confirmation of Abraham's theory, refuting the Lorentz-Einstein principle of relativity. For some years, this weighed heavily against the latter. However, Kaufmann's results were criticized by Max Planck, Adolf Bestelmeyer (1906), and Walter Ritz (1908). The experiments were repeated by Alfred Bucherer (1908), Neumann (1914), and others, with results which appeared to confirm the Lorentz-Einstein theory and to disprove that of Abraham. However, it was pointed out later that the results were not accurate enough to distinguish between the theories. The uncertainty continued until 1940, when such experiments were accurate enough to rule out competing models. Today, the relativistic Lorentz-Einstein relations for momentum and energy are confirmed routinely in particle accelerators, see Tests of relativistic energy and momentum.

Note, however, that this uncertainty concerned only the relativistic mass of the electron. Even in 1917, investigations of the fine structure of the hydrogen lines provided confirmation of the Lorentz-Einstein formula, contradicting that of Abraham.

See also
 History of special relativity

References

Publications

External links 
 The Kaufmann Experiments (Power point presentation)
 http://www-atm.jst.go.jp:8080/16030302_1.html (Japanese)
 Viaje medios de comunicación compras at itfisica.net at itfisica.net (Italian)
 Zeittafel (timetable about physics)

1871 births
1947 deaths
German people of Jewish descent
20th-century German physicists
German Lutherans
Mass spectrometrists
People from Elberfeld
People from the Rhine Province
Technical University of Berlin alumni
Technical University of Munich alumni
Humboldt University of Berlin alumni
Ludwig Maximilian University of Munich alumni
University of Göttingen alumni
Academic staff of the University of Bonn
Academic staff of the University of Königsberg
Academic staff of the University of Freiburg
Scientists from Wuppertal